Gravelly Hill railway station serves the Gravelly Hill area of Birmingham, England. It is situated on the Redditch-Birmingham New Street-Lichfield Cross-City Line.

Opened in 1862, the station was built by the London and North Western (LNWR) railway company on their line between Birmingham and Sutton Coldfield. The only remaining original feature is the booking office building, which is unusual in having 2 storeys, and having access to the ticket office via the upper level. Other buildings and an early wooden footbridge were removed with the electrification of the Cross City line in 1992 by British Rail. The waiting areas on the platforms were replaced by modern "bus shelter" type structures on each platform. The footbridge was replaced by a modern metal structure.

Services

The station is served by West Midlands Trains with local Transport for West Midlands branded "Cross-City" services, operated by Class 323 electrical multiple units.

Access for disabled passengers
There are ramps providing step-free access to both platforms and to the ticket office from the Hunton Hill entrance to the station.

References

An Historical Survey Of Selected LMS Stations Vol. One Dr R Preston and R Powell Hendry. Oxford Pub. Co. (1982, Reprinted in 2001)

External links

Gravelly Hill station at warwickshirerailways.com

Erdington
Railway stations in Birmingham, West Midlands
DfT Category E stations
Former London and North Western Railway stations
Railway stations in Great Britain opened in 1862
Railway stations served by West Midlands Trains
1862 establishments in England